Wise in Time is an album by trumpeter Howard McGhee and saxophonist Teddy Edwards recorded in 1978 and released on the Storyville label.

Reception 

In his review for AllMusic, Scott Yanow stated "Originating from the same recording sessions (trumpeter Howard McGhee's last) that resulted in its superior companion Young at Heart, this set is a bit of a disappointment. McGhee, tenor saxophonist Teddy Edwards, pianist Art Hillery, bassist Leroy Vinnegar and drummer Billy Higgins all sounded fine on the other record but this album sticks exclusively to ballads and the results are dragging and a bit dreary".

Track listing 
 "I Want to Talk About You" (Billy Eckstine) – 5:59
 "I Remember Clifford" (Benny Golson) – 7:55
 "If You Could See Me Now" (Tadd Dameron, Carl Sigman) – 5:58
 "Crescent" (John Coltrane) – 6:57
 "Ruby, My Dear" (Thelonious Monk) – 7:35
 "Time Waits" (Bud Powell) – 5:02

Personnel 
Howard McGhee – trumpet
Teddy Edwards – tenor saxophone
Art Hillery – piano
Leroy Vinnegar – bass
Billy Higgins – drums

References 

1979 albums
Teddy Edwards albums
Storyville Records albums
Howard McGhee albums